Procambarus is a genus of crayfish in the family Cambaridae, all native to North and Central America. It includes a number of troglobitic species, and the marbled crayfish (marmorkrebs), which is parthenogenetic. Originally described as a subgenus for four species, it now contains around 161 species.

Biogeography

The majority of the diversity is found in the southeastern United States, but the genus extends as far south as Guatemala and Honduras, and on the Caribbean island of Cuba. After United States, the highest diversity is in Mexico with about 45 species. Only two are native to Guatemala (P. pilosimanus and P. williamsoni), one to Belize (P. pilosimanus), one to Honduras (P. williamsoni) and three to Cuba (P. atkinsoni, P. cubensis and P. niveus).

Subgenus Ortmannicus was the most widespread, with the range of Procambarus acutus extending as far north as the Great Lakes and New England, as well as south into northeastern Mexico; the subgenus Girardella also extended from the Great Lakes to Mexico, but was distributed further west than Ortmannicus. Scapulicambarus and Pennides were widespread in the southeastern United States, further west (Texas and Louisiana) than Leconticambarus which was centered on Florida and neighbouring states. The subgenus Austrocambarus had the most southerly distribution, being found in Cuba and parts of Central America from Mexico to Belize, Guatemala and Honduras. The other subgenera are more restricted in their distributions, including three endemic to central Mexico, and six endemic to small areas in the United States.

A few species of Procambarus have been introduced to regions outside their native range, both in North America and other continents. They are frequently categorized as invasive species, representing a threat to natives, including rarer crayfish species.

Description

Procambarus can be distinguished from other genera of crayfish by the form of the first pleopod in males, which typically has three or more processes at the tip, compared to two or fewer in Faxonius and Cambarus.

Ecology

Most Procambarus species live in various above-ground waters such as rivers, streams, lakes, ponds and swamps, but several are troglobitic, living in caves, particularly in karstic areas. In the United States, these include both species in subgenus Lonnbergius (P. acherontis and P. morrisi). Other cave-dwellers in the United States with various levels of troglomorphic adaptions are P. attiguus, P. erythrops, P. franzi, P. leitheuseri, P. lucifugus, P. milleri and P. orcinus, but these are all members of subgenera that also include species from above-ground waters. In Cuba, P. niveus is a cave-dweller. In Mexico, many species have been recorded in caves, but most of these have also been recorded from above-ground waters; only P. cavernicola, P. oaxacae, P. rodriguezi and P. xilitlae are strict cave-dwellers and troglomorphic. In 2007, troglomorphic specimens of P. clarkii were found in caves in Portugal and Italy.

Taxonomy

Procambarus was originally described by Arnold Edward Ortmann in 1905 as a subgenus of a wider genus Cambarus, and originally contained only four species (P. williamsoni, P. digueti, P. mexicanus and P. cubensis). The subgenus was elevated in 1942 to the taxonomic rank of genus by Horton H. Hobbs, Jr., who later erected most of the subgenera fornerly recognised within the genus, in his 1972 monograph The subgenera of the crayfish genus Procambarus (Decapoda: Astacidae). However, more recently the subgenera have been eliminated, and while it is recognized that Procambarus in not monophyletic, later literature does not make further taxonomic changes suggesting that more species sampling is required.

Species

Procambarus ablusus Penn, 1963
Procambarus acanthophorus Villalobos, 1948
Procambarus acherontis (Lönnberg, 1894)
Procambarus acutissimus (Girard, 1852)
Procambarus acutus (Girard, 1852)
Procambarus adani Álvarez, Torres & Villalobos, 2021
Procambarus advena (LeConte, 1856)
Procambarus albaughi (Johnson, 2018)
Procambarus alleni (Faxon, 1884)
Procambarus ancylus Hobbs, 1958
†Procambarus angustatus (LeConte, 1856)
Procambarus apalachicolae Hobbs, 1942
Procambarus atkinsoni (Ortmann, 1913)
Procambarus attiguus Hobbs, Jr. & Franz, 1992
Procambarus barbatus (Faxon, 1890)
Procambarus barbiger Fitzpatrick, 1978
Procambarus bivittatus Hobbs, 1942
Procambarus blandingii (Harlan, 1830)
Procambarus bouvieri (Ortmann, 1909)
Procambarus braswelli J. E. Cooper, 1998
Procambarus brazoriensis Albaugh, 1975
Procambarus caballeroi Villalobos, 1944
Procambarus capillatus Hobbs, 1971
Procambarus caritus Hobbs, 1981
Procambarus catemacoensis Rojas, Alvarez & Villalobos, 2000
Procambarus cavernicola Mejía-Ortiz, Hartnoll & Viccon-Pale, 2003 
Procambarus ceruleus Fitzpatrick & Wicksten, 1998
Procambarus chacei Hobbs, 1958
Procambarus citlaltepetl Rojas, Alvarez & Villalobos, 1999
Procambarus clarkii (Girard, 1852)
Procambarus clemmeri Hobbs, 1975
Procambarus cometes Fitzpatrick, 1978
Procambarus connus Fitzpatrick, 1978
Procambarus contrerasi (Creaser, 1931)
Procambarus cubensis (Erichson, 1846)
Procambarus cuetzalanae Hobbs, 1982
Procambarus curdi Reimer, 1975
Procambarus delicatus Hobbs & Franz, 1986
Procambarus digueti (Bouvier, 1897)
Procambarus dupratzi Penn, 1953
Procambarus echinatus Hobbs, 1956
Procambarus econfinae Hobbs, 1942
Procambarus elegans Hobbs, 1969
Procambarus enoplosternum Hobbs, 1947
Procambarus epicyrtus Hobbs, 1958
Procambarus erichsoni Villalobos, 1950
Procambarus erythrops Relyea & Sutton, 1975
Procambarus escambiensis Hobbs, 1942
Procambarus evermanni (Faxon, 1890)
Procambarus fallax (Hagen, 1870)
Procambarus fitzpatricki Hobbs, 1972
Procambarus franzi Hobbs & Lee, 1976
Procambarus geminus Hobbs, 1975
Procambarus geodytes Hobbs, 1942
Procambarus gibbus Hobbs, 1969
Procambarus gonopodocristatus Villalobos, 1958
Procambarus gracilis (Bundy, 1876)
Procambarus hagenianus (Faxon, 1884)
Procambarus hayi (Faxon, 1884)
Procambarus hinei (Ortmann, 1905)
Procambarus hirsutus Hobbs, 1958
Procambarus hoffmanni (Villalobos, 1944)
Procambarus holifieldi (Schuster, Taylor & Adams, 2015)
Procambarus horsti Hobbs & Means, 1972
Procambarus hortonhobbsi Villalobos, 1950
Procambarus howellae Hobbs, 1952
Procambarus hubbelli (Hobbs, 1940)
Procambarus hybus Hobbs & Walton, 1957
Procambarus incilis Pennington, 1962
Procambarus jaculus Hobbs & Walton, 1957
Procambarus kensleyi Hobbs, Jr., 1990
Procambarus kilbyi (Hobbs, 1940)
Procambarus lagniappe Black, 1968
Procambarus latipleurum Hobbs, 1942
Procambarus lecontei (Hagen, 1870)
Procambarus leitheuseri Franz & Hobbs, 1983
Procambarus leonensis Hobbs, 1942
Procambarus lepidodactylus Hobbs, 1947
Procambarus lewisi Hobbs & Walton, 1959
Procambarus liberorum Fitzpatrick, 1978 syn. Procambarus ferrugineus Hobbs & Robison, 1988
Procambarus litosternum Hobbs, 1947
Procambarus llamasi Villalobos, 1954
Procambarus lophotus Hobbs & Walton, 1960
Procambarus lucifugus (Hobbs, 1940)
Procambarus lunzi (Hobbs, 1940)
Procambarus luxus (Johnson, 2011)
Procambarus lylei Fitzpatrick & Hobbs, 1971
Procambarus machardyi Walls, 2006
Procambarus mancus Hobbs & Walton, 1957
Procambarus marthae Hobbs, 1975
Procambarus maya Alvarez, López-Mejía & Villalobos, 2007
Procambarus medialis Hobbs, 1975
Procambarus mexicanus (Erichson, 1846)
Procambarus milleri Hobbs, 1971
Procambarus mirandai Villalobos, 1954
Procambarus morrisi Hobbs, Jr. & Franz, 1991
Procambarus natchitochae Penn, 1953
Procambarus nechesae Hobbs, Jr., 1990
Procambarus nigrocinctus Hobbs, Jr., 1990
Procambarus niveus Hobbs & Villalobos, 1964
Procambarus nueces Hobbs, Jr. & Hobbs III, 1995
Procambarus oaxacae Hobbs, 1973
Procambarus okaloosae Hobbs, 1942
Procambarus olmecorum Hobbs, 1987
Procambarus orcinus Hobbs & Means, 1972
Procambarus ortmannii Villalobos, 1949
Procambarus ouachitae Penn, 1956
Procambarus paeninsulanus (Faxon, 1914)
Procambarus pallidus (Hobbs, 1940)
Procambarus paradoxus (Ortmann, 1906)
Procambarus parasimulans Hobbs & Robison, 1982
Procambarus pearsei (Creaser, 1934)
Procambarus penni Hobbs, 1951
Procambarus pentastylus Walls & Black, 2008
Procambarus petersi Hobbs, 1981
Procambarus pictus (Hobbs, 1940)
Procambarus pilosimanus (Ortmann, 1906)
Procambarus planirostris Penn, 1953
Procambarus plumimanus Hobbs & Walton, 1958
Procambarus pogum Fitzpatrick, 1978
Procambarus primaevus (Packard, 1880)
Procambarus pubescens (Faxon, 1884)
Procambarus pubischelae Hobbs, 1942
Procambarus pubischelae deficiens Hobbs, 1981
Procambarus pycnogonopodus Hobbs, 1942
Procambarus pygmaeus Hobbs, 1942
Procambarus raneyi Hobbs, 1953
Procambarus rathbunae (Hobbs, 1940)
Procambarus regalis Hobbs & Robison, 1988
Procambarus regiomontanus Villalobos, 1954
Procambarus reimeri Hobbs, 1979
Procambarus riojai (Villalobos, 1944)
Procambarus roberti Villalobos & Hobbs, 1974
Procambarus rodriguezi Hobbs, 1943
Procambarus rogersi (Hobbs, 1938)
Procambarus ruthveni Pearse, 1911
Procambarus sbordonii Hobbs, 1977
Procambarus seminolae Hobbs, 1942
Procambarus shermani Hobbs, 1942
Procambarus simulans (Faxon, 1884)
Procambarus spiculifer (LeConte, 1856)
Procambarus steigmani Hobbs, Jr., 1991
Procambarus strenthi Hobbs, 1977
Procambarus suttkusi Hobbs, 1953
Procambarus talpoides Hobbs, 1981
Procambarus texanus Hobbs, 1971
Procambarus teziutlanensis (Villalobos, 1947)
Procambarus tlapacoyanensis (Villalobos, 1947)
Procambarus toltecae Hobbs, 1943
Procambarus troglodytes (LeConte, 1856)
Procambarus truculentus Hobbs, 1954
Procambarus tulanei Penn, 1953
Procambarus vazquezae Villalobos, 1954 (species name often misspelled vasquezae)
Procambarus veracruzanus Villalobos, 1954
Procambarus verrucosus Hobbs, 1952
Procambarus versutus (Hagen, 1870)
Procambarus viaeviridis (Faxon, 1914)
Procambarus villalobosi Hobbs, 1969
Procambarus vioscai Penn, 1946
Procambarus vioscai paynei Fitzpatrick, 1990
Procambarus virginalis (Lyko, 2017)
Procambarus williamsoni (Ortmann, 1905)
Procambarus xilitlae Hobbs & Grubbs, 1982
Procambarus xochitlanae Hobbs, 1975
Procambarus youngi Hobbs, 1942
Procambarus zapoapensis Villalobos, 1954
Procambarus zihuateutlensis Villalobos, 1950
Procambarus zonangulus Hobbs, Jr. & Hobbs III, 1990

References

External links

Key to the subgenera of Procambarus

Cambaridae
Freshwater crustaceans of North America
Crustacean genera
Taxa named by Arnold Edward Ortmann
Taxonomy articles created by Polbot